Echoes of Time and the River (Echoes II) is an orchestral suite by the American composer George Crumb.  It was commissioned by the University of Chicago to commemorate the university's 75th anniversary.  The piece was first performed by the Chicago Symphony Orchestra conducted by Irwin Hoffman at the University of Chicago's Mandel Hall on May 26, 1967.  The piece was awarded the 1968 Pulitzer Prize for Music.

Structure
Echoes of Time and the River has a duration of approximately 18 minutes and is cast in four movements:
Frozen Time
Remembrance of Time
Collapse of Time
Last Echoes of Time

Instrumentation
The work is scored for a large orchestra consisting of three flutes (doubling piccolo), three clarinets (doubling E-flat clarinet), three horns, three trumpets, three trombones, timpani, six percussionists, two pianos (doubling celesta), mandolin, harp, and strings.

References

1967 compositions
Compositions by George Crumb
Compositions that use extended techniques
Orchestral suites